

References

Indonesia
Massacres
 
Massacres